
Gmina Brody is a rural gmina (administrative district) in Starachowice County, Świętokrzyskie Voivodeship, in south-central Poland.

Villages
Gmina Brody contains the villages and settlements of Adamów, Bór Kunowski, Brody, Budy Brodzkie, Dziurów, Henryk, Jabłonna, Krynki, Kuczów, Lipie, Lubienia, Młynek, Połągiew, Ruda, Rudnik, Staw Kunowski and Styków.

Neighbouring gminas
Gmina Brody is bordered by the town of Starachowice and by the gminas of Iłża, Kunów, Mirzec, Pawłów, Rzeczniów, Sienno and Wąchock.

References
 Polish official population figures 2006

Brody
Starachowice County